Tycho van Meer (born 30 September 1974 in Eindhoven) is a former field hockey striker from the Netherlands, who represented his native country at the 1996 Summer Olympics in Atlanta, Georgia. There he won the golden medal with the Dutch national team. A former player of HGC, Oranje Zwart and Amsterdam, he earned a total number of 90 caps, scoring seventeen goals for the Dutch during the late 1990s.

References
  Dutch Olympic Committee

External links
 

1974 births
Living people
Dutch male field hockey players
Male field hockey forwards
Olympic field hockey players of the Netherlands
Field hockey players at the 1996 Summer Olympics
1998 Men's Hockey World Cup players
Sportspeople from Eindhoven
Olympic gold medalists for the Netherlands
Olympic medalists in field hockey
Medalists at the 1996 Summer Olympics
HGC players
Oranje Zwart players
Amsterdamsche Hockey & Bandy Club players
20th-century Dutch people
21st-century Dutch people